Chedli El-Marghni (born 19 April 1939) is a Tunisian racewalker. He competed in the men's 20 kilometres walk at the 1964 Summer Olympics.

References

1939 births
Living people
Athletes (track and field) at the 1964 Summer Olympics
Tunisian male racewalkers
Olympic athletes of Tunisia
Place of birth missing (living people)
20th-century Tunisian people